John Makin may refer to: 

John Makin (politician), 16th-century member of parliament for Colchester
John H. Makin (1943–2015), American economist
John Makin (singer) (1950–2011), British-Belgian singer